Eugenia albida is a plant species in the family Myrtaceae. It is endemic to Ecuador.

References

albida
Endemic flora of Ecuador
Critically endangered flora of South America
Taxa named by Aimé Bonpland
Taxonomy articles created by Polbot